The George Town Public Library is the main library of the Cayman Islands Public Library Service, a department of the Cayman Islands Ministry of Education. It is located in George Town, capital of the Cayman Islands. It has been designated as a place of historic significance  and has been referred to as "one of the country’s most important national assets."

History 

The George Town Public Library began in 1920 as a small room above the city's old jail and was funded as a subscription library through a $40 grant from the Cayman Islands government. A separate library building was finished in 1939, designed by Captain Roland Bodden and Captain Rayal Bodden, with a ceiling modeled after an inverted ship's hull. While the library was opened to the public in 1940, it was not until 1980 that it was staffed with a trained, professional librarian.
The library was expanded in 2009 to include the modernized, three-story Maples Wing, providing a children's services area and public computers with internet access. Early in 2017, a renovation of the historic library building was completed in order to showcase local Caymanian history and culture.

References 

Buildings and structures in George Town, Cayman Islands
Educational organisations based in the Cayman Islands